Francisco Mendes, nom de guerre Chico Té (February 7, 1939 – July 7, 1978), was a Bissau-Guinean politician. He was the country's first Prime Minister and held that position from September 24, 1973, until his fatal car accident under suspicious circumstances on July 7, 1978.

Early career
Mendes was born in Enxude, Guinea-Bissau. In the early 1960s, the African Party for the Independence of Guinea and Cape Verde (PAIGC) launched an armed struggle against Portuguese imperialism which would last more than a decade. Mendes was one of the few Guinea-Bissau students in secondary education when he abandoned school to join the PAIGC. He rose through the ranks in the 1960s, becoming a political commissar of the Bafatá area in 1962. In the years 1963–1964 he held the same function on the Northern Front. He entered the Political Bureau in 1964 and he became a member of PAIGC's Council of War in 1965. In 1967 he was appointed delegate of the Council for the Northern Front.

Prime minister
After negotiations between Portugal and PAIGC in early 1974, Portugal granted independence to Guinea-Bissau despite PAIGC having declared unilateral independence nearly a year prior. The PAIGC-led government was headed by Luís Cabral, half-brother of the PAIGC co-founder Amílcar Cabral whose assassination in Conakry on January 20, 1973, remains a mystery. Francisco Mendes was elected the country's first Prime Minister as Comissário Principal and in this role in the newly UN-member, Francisco Mendes was responsible for a series of socialism-inspired development programs, and a four-year drive toward national reconciliation. Mendes' signature graced the first four banknotes (10, 50, 100 and 500 peso) issued in 1976 in Guinea-Bissau.

Although the causes behind his death on July 7, 1978, are still disputed, it is mostly accepted that PAIGC was involved in it. A widely accepted theory – though unverifiable as of 2006 – is that dissent among PAIGC leadership may have led to his assassination.

Honours
As an African nationalist and a national figure in the struggle for independence, Francisco Mendes has been honoured both in Guinea-Bissau and Cape Verde. In addition to his face being featured on 500 Pesos Guineense (second (1983) and third (1990) issues), many schools and streets bearing his name can be seen throughout Guinea-Bissau, and Francisco Mendes International Airport in Praia, Cape Verde was named in his honour.

Personal life
He married in 1973 in Ziguinchor, Senegal and left two sons and two daughters behind.

References

1939 births
1978 deaths
Prime Ministers of Guinea-Bissau
Assassinated Bissau-Guinean politicians
People murdered in Guinea-Bissau
Assassinated heads of government
African Party for the Independence of Guinea and Cape Verde politicians
Bissau-Guinean lawyers
20th-century lawyers